West Moors is a closed railway station in Dorset. Opened in 1867, it became the junction of the Southampton and Dorchester Railway and the Salisbury and Dorset Junction Railway. Although passenger services were withdrawn in 1964 as a result of the Beeching Report, the line remained open until 1974 for freight trains serving the Royal Army Ordnance Corps fuel depot at West Moors. The track was lifted in 1974.

See also 
List of closed railway stations in Britain

Further reading 

 ISBN (no ISBN)

External links
www.disused-stations.org.uk West Moors
Rural Rides
 Station on navigable O.S. map

Disused railway stations in Dorset
Former London and South Western Railway stations
Railway stations in Great Britain opened in 1867
Railway stations in Great Britain closed in 1964
Beeching closures in England